Saint Mary's College is a private Catholic women's liberal arts college in Notre Dame, Indiana. Founded in 1844 by the Sisters of the Holy Cross, the name of the school refers to the Virgin Mary.

Saint Mary's offers five bachelor's degrees and more than 30 major areas of study. Additionally, Saint Mary's College offers five graduate degrees: Master of Autism Studies, Master of Science, Master of Social Work, and Doctor of Nursing Practice.

History
In 1843, four Sisters of the Holy Cross came from Le Mans, France, to share in the apostolate of education under invitation of Edward Sorin, who together with his priests and brothers of the Congregation of Holy Cross had founded the University of Notre Dame. In 1844, the sisters opened their first school in Bertrand, Michigan, about six miles from Notre Dame; it was a boarding academy with pre-collegiate grades. In 1855 the school moved to its present site, under the leadership of Mother Angela Gillespie. The main building and a former blacksmith shop used as a office were drawn by oxen to the new location.

Ellen Ewing Sherman, wife of General William Tecumseh Sherman was a cousin of Mother Angela Gillespie, directress of Saint Mary's Academy. In 1864, Ellen took up temporary residence in South Bend, Indiana, to have her young family educated at the University of Notre Dame and St. Mary's. At the age of fifteen, Mary Ellen Quinlan, who later became the mother of playwright Eugene O'Neill, attended Saint Mary's Academy and graduated with honors in music, playing Chopin's Polonaise for piano, op. 22, at the commencement.

Saint Mary's College eventually grew from the Academy. A typewriting course was introduced in 1886; students practiced on Remington typewriters. In 1915 a course in auto mechanics was offered in hopes that students would become "intelligent" drivers. It was taught by Miss Mary Callahan, who had taken a course at a Studebaker plant in Detroit, and John Seibert, the college chauffeur. Studebaker executive A.R. Erskine donated a vehicle for hands-on instruction.

In 1945 Saint Mary's Academy moved to the former Erskine estate on the south side of South Bend.  Saint Mary's College is located across the street (Indiana 933) from the University of Notre Dame. Saint Mary's was the first women's college in the Great Lakes region.

Today the school offers five bachelor's degrees and, beginning in 2015, four master's degrees (the master's programs are co-educational). There are approximately 120,000 living alumnae. Proposals to merge with University of Notre Dame (then a men's institution) in the early 1970s were rejected by Saint Mary's College, and Notre Dame became coeducational on its own in 1972. The College resides within the Diocese of Fort Wayne-South Bend.

Presidents
 M. Pauline O'Neill, 1895–1931
 Sister Irma Burns, 1931–1934
 Madeleva Wolff, 1934–1961
 Maria Renata Daily, 1961–1965
 Mary Grace Kos, 1965–1967
 John J. McGrath, 1968–1970
 Alma Peter, 1970–1972 (interim appointment)
 Edward L. Henry, 1972–1974
 John M. Duggan, 1975–1985
 William A. Hickey, 1986–1997
 Marilou Eldred, 1997–2004
 Carol Ann Mooney, 2004–2016
 Janice Cervelli, 2016–2018
 Nancy P. Nekvasil, 2018–2020 (interim appointment)
 Katie Conboy, 2020–present

Women's Choir
The Saint Mary's College Women's Choir, a select 40-voice ensemble under the direction of Nancy Menk, regularly commissions and performs new works for women's voices. In February 2005, the Choir appeared before the national convention of the American Choral Directors Association in Los Angeles, performing in the Wilshire Christian Church and the new Walt Disney Concert Hall. The Choir tours nationally every other year, and regularly performs with the University of Notre Dame Glee Club in joint performances of major works with the South Bend Symphony Orchestra. In March 2011, the choir traveled to China to sing at colleges and universities in Shanghai, Nanjing, and Suzhou.  They have appeared in concert at Carnegie Hall in 1999 and 2001, and returned there in November 2005 to perform music by Gwyneth Walker for women's voices and orchestra. The Women's Choir has recorded four compact discs on the ProOrgano label: Ave, Ave!, recorded in 1997, Amazing Day!, recorded in 2002, Anima Mea!, recorded in 2004 and Across the Bar, recorded in 2007.

Madeleva Lecture 
The college hosts a lecture series named after Sr. Madeleva Wolff, CSC, who served as the college's third president, to honor her establishment in 1943 of a School of Sacred Theology (since closed) that provided the first opportunity in the U.S. for women to pursue graduate studies in theology. The lecture series highlights the work of women in theology.

Past Madeleva Lecturers 

 Monika K. Hellwig, 1985
 Sandra M. Schneiders, IHM, 1986
 Mary Collins, OSB, 1987
 Maria Harris, 1988
 Elizabeth Dreyer, 1989
 Joan Chittister, OSB, 1990
 Dolores Leckey, 1991
 Lisa Sowle Cahill, 1992
 Elizabeth A. Johnson, CSJ, 1993
 Gail Porter Mandell, 1994
 Diana L. Hayes, 1995
 Jeanette Rodriguez, 1996
 Mary C. Boys, SNJM, 1997
 Kathleen Norris, 1998
 Denise Lardner Carmody, 1999
 Sandra M. Schneiders, IHM, 2000
 Mary Catherine Hilkert, OP, 2001
 Margaret Farley, RSM, 2002
 Sidney Callahan, 2003
 Mary Ann Hinsdale, IHM, 2004
 Past Madeleva Lecturers on the 40th Anniversary of Vatican II, 2005
 Susan A. Ross, 2006
 M. Shawn Copeland, 2007
 Barbara Fiand, SNDdeN, 2008
 Anne E. Patrick, SNJM, 2009
 Wendy M. Wright, 2010
 Kwok Pui-Lan, 2011
 Kathleen Hughes, RSCJ, 2012
 Catherine E. Clifford, 2013
 Christine Firer Hinze, 2014
 Voices of Young Catholic Women, A Panel Discussion, 2015
 Marianne Farina, CSC, 2016
 Ilia Delio, OSF, 2017
 Mercy Amba Oduyoye, 2018
 Nancy Pineda-Madrid, 2019
 Lecture Postponed, 2020
 Barbara Reid, OP, 2021
 Lecture Canceled, 2022

Athletics
The college, a National Collegiate Athletic Association Division III school, and a member of the Michigan Intercollegiate Athletic Association, sponsors eight varsity teams: tennis, volleyball, soccer, basketball, lacrosse, golf, softball, and cross country.

Saint Mary's women also may participate in the intramural program and/or clubs in a variety of sports. Its club sports program offers recreational opportunities through competition and instruction. The clubs are open to all Saint Mary's students, although membership requirements vary with each club. Many offerings are coeducational with the University of Notre Dame. Saint Mary's sponsored clubs are cheerleading, dance, and volleyball teams. Other clubs co-sponsored with the University of Notre Dame are equestrian, figure skating, gymnastics, skiing, water polo, field hockey, ice hockey, Ultimate, and cycling.

Angela Athletic Facility expands opportunities for campus-wide recreation activities. Indoor facilities include basketball/volleyball, and a fitness center with treadmills, stairmasters, spin bikes, and Cybex weight machines. Outdoor facilities include a six-court outdoor tennis facility; softball, lacrosse and soccer fields; volleyball and basketball courts, areas for cross-country skiing, and a nature trail for hiking or jogging.

The Saint Mary's College athletic mascots are the Belles. In 1975, Saint Mary's began to form intercollegiate varsity sports. They did not, however, begin 'playing' until 1977 when the tennis team played to an 8-1 NAIA match victory. It was there that the college competitors unveiled new team T-shirts with "Belles" emblazoned across the front.

Campus and buildings

The  campus features buildings in a variety of architectural styles and periods. Highlights include the Le Mans and Holy Cross Halls. Dedicated in 1926, Le Mans Hall is the second oldest building on campus and serves as the administration building and a residence hall. Holy Cross Hall, also a residence hall, was dedicated in 1906 and is the oldest building on campus.

Academic and administrative facilities

Angela Athletic Facility
The recreation and athletic facility houses tennis, basketball, and volleyball courts in a gym area with seating for 2,000. Racquetball courts and space for gymnastics and for fencing are adjacent to the main gym. Architect Helmut Jahn designed the building. The building was dedicated in 1977 and is named for Mother Angela Gillespie, CSC, the first American to head Saint Mary's Academy, which became Saint Mary's College. Mother Angela oversaw the school moving from Bertrand Township, Michigan, to its present location in 1855. She was not a president of Saint Mary's College. Side note: There was an Angela Hall on campus that was used as the athletic facility as well as for plays, commencement and other activities. It was dedicated in May 1892 and razed in 1975. Angela was renovated and completely remodeled in 2017.

Cushwa-Leighton Library
Designed by noted Indianapolis architect Evans Woollen III, the principal and founder of Woollen, Molzan and Partners, the two-story, rectangular-shaped library was one of the five winners of the AIA/ALA Library Building Award for 1983. The  facility was designed to fit the specific setting and serves as the closing element to a secondary quadrangle of the college campus. Its modern design borrows shapes and colors from the surrounding buildings and includes a contemporary treatment of a Gothic building with a steeply-sloped roof, gables, a tower, dormers, and brick exterior. The periodical room is the library's most prominent space. Study areas of various sizes are built around the interior perimeter; the library stacks are placed at the building's core. The library also includes a decorative tower that functions as a secondary building and houses offices, meetings rooms, a staff lounge, and storage space. The library has a seating capacity of 540 and provides access to more than 268,000 books and audiovisual materials and more than 900 current print periodical subscriptions. The library also subscribes to more than 200 electronic periodical titles and numerous electronic indexes to journal articles. Dedicated in 1982, the building is named for Margaret Hall Cushwa (class of 1930) and Mary Lou Morris Leighton.

Haggar College Center
Originally dedicated in 1942 as Alumnae Centennial Library, the building was later the student center where the snack bar was located. The building now houses administrative offices and Information Technology. It is named in honor of the Haggar Foundation of Dallas, which provided the lead gift for the renovation to a student center in 1983. The Haggar family has strong ties to the college. Joseph M. Haggar Sr. (founder of Haggar Clothing Company) and his Rose Haggar are parents and grandparents of several Saint Mary's alumnae.

Havican Hall
This is a former elementary school building on campus operated by Sisters of the Holy Cross, which was open between 1951 and 1970. It was called St. Mary's Campus School. It now houses the Early Childhood Development Center (ECDC). Named for Mother Rose Havican (1893–1964), who graduated from Saint Mary's in 1915. She was Superior General of the Congregation from 1943 to 1955.

Holy Cross Hall
This residence hall is the oldest college building on campus. It was dedicated in 1903 and is named for the congregation that founded Saint Mary's College. Both Holy Cross and Le Mans Halls were built under the leadership of Mother Pauline O'Neill, the first president of Saint Mary's College. Mother Pauline, known as "the builder," is also responsible for installing Lake Marian and erecting the stone front entrance to Saint Mary's College.

Le Mans Hall
Dedicated in 1926, Le Mans is the second oldest college building. Le Mans Hall is named for a city in northwest France where Blessed Basil Anthony Moreau founded the Congregation of the Sisters of Holy Cross and the Congregation of the Holy Cross (brothers and priests). Le Mans Hall is the administration building (first floor) and a residence hall. Note that Le Mans is two words. Le Mans Tower is the bell tower at the center of Le Mans Hall. At the top of the tower sits a cross. Le Mans Tower is to Saint Mary's College what the Golden Dome is to the University of Notre Dame, a symbol of the institution. Commencement is held each May on Le Mans Green, the south lawn in front of Le Mans Hall.

Madeleva Hall
Originally constructed in 1966 (dedicated in 1968), Madeleva Hall underwent a substantial interior renovation that was completed in August 2009. The building currently houses the mathematics and education departments and has faculty offices, classrooms, an auditorium, and student gathering spaces. Arkos Design was the architect and interior designer for the renovation. The building is named for Sister M. Madeleva Wolff, CSC, president of Saint Mary's College from 1934 to 1961.

McCandless Hall
Residence hall dedicated in 1965 and named for Marion McCandless, Class of 1900. She was the first executive director of the Alumnae Association, from 1927 to 1955. She resided at Saint Mary's from 1927 until her death in 1972.

Noble Family Dining Hall
The Noble Family Dining Hall is located in the Student Center, though the dining hall was constructed before the rest of the center. The dining hall was named in 1997 in honor of Myron and Rosie Noble, parents of Wendy Noble Heidle '87 and Heidi Noble Drysdale '92. Myron Noble was a Saint Mary's College trustee from 1992 to 2004 and Myron and Rosie Noble were on the Parents Council from 1989 to 1992. The Noble Family Dining Hall was dedicated in 2003 and the Student Center was dedicated in 2005.

O'Laughlin Auditorium
O'Laughlin holds 1,300 people. It is the second largest venue in St. Joseph County (Morris Performing Arts Center is the largest). O'Laughlin is even larger than DeBartolo Performing Arts Center at the University of Notre Dame. It is named for Sister Francis Jerome, CSC (Susan O'Laughlin). Sister Francis served Saint Mary's as vice president under Sister M. Madeleva Wolff, CSC, and was a professor of Greek and Latin. Her bequest of $500,000 was designated for the construction of a fine arts building.

Opus Hall
Opus is an apartment-style residence hall on campus for seniors only. Built in 2004, it can house up to 72 seniors. It is named for Opus Corporation, a Gerald Rauenhorst family enterprise. His daughter and granddaughter are alumnae of the college.

Regina Hall
Regina Hall was built on the site of the 1915 Astronomy Observatory, which had not been used to its fullest potential as students were not allowed out of the residence halls after dark. Regina was established in 1965 as a convent for the Congregation of the Sisters of the Holy Cross. The building was leased to the college as a residence hall in 1969. The college purchased the building in 1994. It was almost all single rooms until the space was remodeled around 2001 to include single, double, and quad. In 2021 the Department of Nursing Science relocated to Regina Hall in the new Center for Integrated Healthcare Education, allowing the department of nursing to increase its class sizes and improve opportunities for hands-on simulation.

Riedinger House
Built in 1939 as a laboratory ("practice") house for the Department of Home Economics. It now serves as a guest residence for alumnae/special College guests. Monsignor John J. McGrath, president of the college from 1968 to 1970, lived in the house when he was president. It was named for first mother-daughter legacy family: Adaline Crowley Riedinger (Class of 1864), was the first alumna to send her daughter, Mary Adalaide Riedinger (Class of 1889) to Saint Mary's College.

Science Hall
Originally science classes were held in Academy Hall until Collegiate Hall was built in 1903. Science Hall was completed in 1955. Between 1985 and 1987, a $6.5 million transformation doubled the size of the structure. In the spring of 2010, the college announced receiving $9 million from philanthropists MaryAnn and Clay Mathile to fund a major renovation of Science Hall. It is the largest private gift in the college's history. Their daughter Jennifer Mathile Prikkel '95 donated an additional $1 million to the project, resulting in a combined gift of $10 million.

Spes Unica Hall
The  building, which opened for classes in the fall of 2008, boasts a clean design and modern classroom, laboratory, and office spaces along with well-appointed common areas where students and faculty can gather. The hall houses 13 departments, the Career Crossing Office and the three Centers of Distinction: the Center for Academic Innovation, the Center for Spirituality and the Center for Women's Intercultural Leadership. Ballinger Architects of Philadelphia and Architecture Design Group of South Bend designed the building, and construction began in the fall of 2006.

Notable faculty
 Richard Aaker Trythall, Rome campus
 John Brademas, 1956–1958
 Catherine Ann Cline
 Leo Podolsky, 18 years
 Cyriac Pullapilly, founder of the Semester Around the World Program
 Sister Miriam Joseph Rauh, CSC, 1898–1982
Barbara Blondeau
Daniel P. Horan, O.F.M.

Notable alumnae
 Nora Barry Fischer, U.S. federal judge
 Mary Fels, philanthropist, suffragist, Georgist
 Helen Klanderud, former mayor of Aspen, Colorado, from 2001 to 2007
 Mary Ellen Quinlan O'Neill, mother of playwright Eugene O'Neill
 Catherine Hicks, actress
 Adriana Trigiani, author
 Eddie Bernice Johnson, congresswoman
 London Lamar, Tennessee senator
 Denise DeBartolo York, businesswoman, owner of the San Francisco 49ers

References

External links

 
1844 establishments in Indiana
Association of Catholic Colleges and Universities
Buildings and structures in St. Joseph County, Indiana
Education in St. Joseph County, Indiana
Educational institutions established in 1844
History of women in Indiana
Holy Cross universities and colleges
Liberal arts colleges in Indiana
Notre Dame, Indiana
Roman Catholic Diocese of Fort Wayne–South Bend
Catholic universities and colleges in Indiana
Women's universities and colleges in the United States